Segraves is a surname. Notable people with the surname include:

Robert Taylor Segraves (born 1941), American psychiatrist

See also
Segraves v. State of California, a 1981 case brought against California for teaching evolution
Seagraves (disambiguation)
Seagrave (disambiguation)
Segrave (disambiguation)